ACF Fiorentina is an Italian football team based in Florence, founded in 1926. 
The list encompasses the major honours won by Fiorentina and the records set by the players and the club.

Honours

National titles
Serie A:
 Winners (2) : 1955–56; 1968–69
 Runners-up (5): 1956–57; 1957–58; 1958–59; 1959–60; 1981–82

Coppa Italia:
 Winners (6) : 1939–40; 1960–61; 1965–66; 1974–75; 1995–96; 2000–01
 Runners-up (4): 1958, 1959–60, 1998–99, 2013–14

Supercoppa Italiana:
 Winners (1) : 1996
 Runners-up (1): 2001

European titles
European Cup:
 Runners-up (1): 1956–57

UEFA Cup Winners' Cup:
 Winners (1) : 1960–61
 Runners-up (1): 1961–62

UEFA Cup:
 Runners-up (1): 1989–90

Minor titles
Coppa Grasshoppers
 Winners (1) : 1957

Mitropa Cup
 Winners (1) : 1966

Anglo-Italian League Cup
 Winners (1) : 1975

Serie B
 Winners: 1930–31; 1938–39; 1993–94

Serie C2 (as Florentia Viola)
 Winners: 2002–03

Serie A record by opponent
Following is a table detailing ACF Fiorentina's record against each opponent in Serie A. It includes only results from seasons disputed in a single group round robin format. The data is updated to the end of the 2014-15 season.

ACF Fiorentina in European competitions

Player records

Appearances
Only including appearances in competitive matches, including substitutes.

Most appearances in all competitions

Most appearances in Serie A

Goalscorers
Only including goals scored in competitive matches, including substitutes.

Top goalscorers in all official competitions

Top goalscorers in Serie A

Club records

 Biggest home win:
 8–0 v Modena (1941–42)
 Biggest home defeat:
 0–5 v Juventus (2011–12)
 Biggest away win:
 7–1 v Atalanta (1963–64)
 Biggest away defeat:
 0–8 v Juventus (1952–53)
 Most points in a season:
 70 (2012–13)
 Fewest points in a season:
 15 (1937–38)
 Most wins in a season:
 22 (2005–06)
 Fewest wins in a season:
 3 (1937–38 & 1970–71)
 Most defeats in a season:
 22 (2001–02)
 Fewest defeats in a season:
 1 (1955–56 & 1968–69)
 Most goals in a season:
 95 (1958–59)
 Fewest goals in a season:
 26 (1970–71 & 1978–79)
 Most goals conceded in a season:
 69 (1946–47)
 Fewest goals conceded in a season:
 17 (1981–82)

 First Italian club to play in a European Cup final, in the 1956–57 European Cup.
 First Italian club to win an official UEFA competition, in the 1960–61 European Cup Winners' Cup.

References

Fiorentina
ACF Fiorentina